The 1980 All-Ireland Senior Ladies' Football Championship Final was the seventh All-Ireland Final and the deciding match of the 1980 All-Ireland Senior Ladies' Football Championship, an inter-county ladies' Gaelic football tournament for the top teams in Ireland.

Cavan dominated the game but couldn't get the needed scores.

References

Ladies}
All-Ireland Senior Ladies' Football Championship Finals
Cavan county ladies' football team matches
Tipperary county ladies' football team matches